Scythris kebiliensis is a moth of the family Scythrididae. It was described by Bengt Å. Bengtsson in 1997. It is found in Tunisia.

References

kebiliensis
Moths described in 1997